A list of films produced in France in 1958.

See also
 1958 in France
 1958 in French television

External links
 French films of 1958 at the Internet Movie Database
French films of 1958 at Cinema-francais.fr

1958
Films
French